The Karlsdal Chapel is a chapel in Karlskoga Municipality in Sweden, located in Karlsdal, 15 km (9 mi) north of Karlskoga.

In 1736, Karl Luthman, an ironmaster, applied for permission to build a chapel at Karlsdal because the distance to Karlskoga Church was too far. The chapel building was completed in 1842, and served as the church to the Karlsdal Church Parish until 1922 when it merged with the Karlskoga Church Parish.

References

Citations

Works cited

External links 
 

19th-century Church of Sweden church buildings
Churches in Örebro County
Chapels in Sweden
Churches completed in 1842
Churches in the Diocese of Karlstad

Buildings and structures in Karlskoga Municipality